On The Fringe is a popular Pakistani television show on Indus Music. It is hosted and scripted by the eccentric television host and music critic, Fasi Zaka and directed by Zeeshan Pervez. The show gained popularity and a bit of notoriety because of the way it conducts itself, i.e. by parodying the formulaic structure of most mainstream shows and asking questions about social and political matters from pop stars.

When explaining the format and concept of the show, Zaka has said that people like Nadeem F. Paracha have caused shows like On The Fringe to have come about.

See also
Zeeshan Pervez
Fasi Zaka
Sajid & Zeeshan

Pakistani music journalism